Ludwig Schneider may refer to:
 Ludwig Schneider (wrestler), German wrestler
 Ludwig Karl Eduard Schneider, German politician and botanist
 Louis Schneider (actor) (Ludwig Wilhelm Schneider), German actor and author